Serhiy Serhiyovych Romanov (born 21 July 1997) is a Ukrainian footballer who plays as a left midfielder.

Career
Originally admitted to Zorya Luhansk as the product of Luhansk sports schools, until 2016 he played for the club's youth squads in the Ukrainian Premier League youth competitions. In 2016 Romanov joined the newly formed FC Metalist 1925 Kharkiv.

On 2 November 2018 Romanov was recognized as the player of month for October by PFL.

References

External links 
 
 
 Profile. Metalist 1925

1997 births
Living people
People from Popasna
Ukrainian footballers
Association football midfielders
FC Zorya Luhansk players
FC Metalist 1925 Kharkiv players
FC Metalist Kharkiv players
FC Hirnyk-Sport Horishni Plavni players
Ukrainian First League players
Ukrainian Second League players
Ukrainian Amateur Football Championship players